Sylvia Molloy may refer to:

 Sylvia Clark Molloy was a British Realist and Impressionist artist and teacher
 Sylvia Molloy (writer) is an Argentine professor, author, editor and essayist